This is a list of statistics and records of the Sri Lanka Premier League, a Twenty20 cricket competition based in Sri Lanka. The statistics and records included in this article take into account only those matches where two SLPL teams were playing against each other as part of an SLPL season. They do not include the results of trial games, exhibition matches, or games played in other tournaments such as the Champions League Twenty20.

Team records

Result summary

Highest totals

Lowest totals

Highest match aggregates

External links
 
 Sri Lanka Premier League on YouTube

Sri Lanka Premier League
Cricket records and statistics
records